The name Ira has been used for two tropical cyclones in the northwest Pacific Ocean.

 Tropical Storm Ira (1991) (T9022, 23W) – struck Vietnam.
 Typhoon Ira (1993) (T9323, 30W) – struck the Philippines.

Pacific typhoon set index articles